Royal is an unincorporated community in northeastern Phelps County, in the U.S. state of Missouri. The community is on Missouri Route B, approximately eight miles north of St. James.

History
A post office called Royal was established in 1892, and remained in operation until 1916. It is unknown why the name "Royal" was applied to this community.

References

Unincorporated communities in Phelps County, Missouri
Unincorporated communities in Missouri